Packera multilobata is a species of flowering plant in the aster family known by the common name lobeleaf groundsel. It is native to the western United States from California to Wyoming to New Mexico, where it is common and can be found in many habitat types.

It is an annual or perennial herb producing a single stem or a cluster of several stems up to about half a meter tall from a taproot and branching caudex unit. The leaves are divided into several lobes, often so deeply that they look like separate leaflets. The inflorescence is a wide array of flower heads lined with green or yellowish phyllaries and containing many yellow disc florets. Most heads have a fringe of yellow ray florets, but at times these can be absent.

Parts of this plant were used medicinally by Native American peoples including the Navajo and Yavapai.

References

External links
Jepson Manual Treatment
USDA Plants Profile
Flora of North America
Southwest Colorado Wildflowers: Packera
Photo gallery

multilobata
Flora of the Western United States
Flora of California
Flora of New Mexico
Flora of the Sierra Nevada (United States)
Flora of the Rocky Mountains
Plants used in traditional Native American medicine
Taxa named by Asa Gray
Flora without expected TNC conservation status